Fox Film Corp v. Doyal, 286 U.S. 123 (1932), was a United States Supreme Court case in which the Court held that states may tax copyright royalties, as they can patent royalties, because even though copyrights & patents are granted by the federal government, they are still private property subject to taxation.

References

External links
 

1932 in United States case law
United States copyright case law
United States Supreme Court cases
United States Supreme Court cases of the Hughes Court
United States taxation and revenue case law